The Western Football Conference was an NCAA Division II scholarship-awarding football conference that existed from 1982 to 1993.

Among its member schools were (from 1982 to 1992 unless otherwise noted): 
 Santa Clara
 Cal Poly SLO
 Cal State Northridge
 Cal Lutheran (1985–1989)
 Sacramento State (1985–1992)
 Southern Utah (1986–1992)
 Portland State
 Cal Poly Pomona (1982)

Its founding, and only, commissioner was Vic Buccola, who had been the athletic director at Cal Poly from 1973 to 1981. He then became a founder and commissioner of the multi-sport American West Conference, which was chartered after the WFC folded in 1993. The WFC folded in part because of a new NCAA rule that prohibited member institutions who competed at the Division I (D-I) level in other sports from competing at the Division II (D-II) level in football. Cal State Northridge, Cal Poly SLO, Southern Utah, and Sacramento State, plus UC Davis for football, were the first announced members of the American West Conference.

Of the eight member schools:

 Four (Cal Poly SLO, Sacramento State, Southern Utah, and Portland State) are currently members of the Division I FCS Big Sky Conference.
 One (California Lutheran) is a member of the Division III Southern California Intercollegiate Athletic Conference (SCIAC).
 Three have dropped football as a varsity sport - Cal Poly Pomona in 1983, Santa Clara in 1993, and Cal State Northridge in 2001 (following a brief stint in the Big Sky). In all other sports, Cal Poly Pomona is currently a member of the Division II California Collegiate Athletic Association, Santa Clara is a member of the Division I West Coast Conference, and Cal State Northridge is a member of the Division I Big West Conference.

The WFC Scholar Athlete of the Year Award was named for Santa Clara's coach Pat Malley. Its recipients include:
 1987: Tracy Morris Downs, M.D., Cal Lutheran

References

Sports organizations established in 1982
Organizations disestablished in 1993
1982 establishments in the United States